The Woman Who Believed is a 1922 American silent drama film, directed by Jack Harvey. It stars Walter Miller and Anna Luther.

References

External links
The Woman Who Believed at the Internet Movie Database

American silent feature films
Silent American drama films
1922 drama films
1922 films
Films directed by Jack Harvey
American black-and-white films
1920s American films